Amen Clinics is a group of mental and physical health clinics that work on the treatment of mood and behavior disorders. It was founded in 1989 by Daniel G. Amen, a self-help guru and psychiatrist. The clinics perform clinical evaluations and brain SPECT (single photon emission computed tomography) imaging to diagnose and treat their patients. Amen Clinics uses SPECT scans, a type of brain-imaging technology, to measure neural activity through blood flow. It has a database of more than 100,000 functional brain scans from patients in 111 countries.

Amen Clinics has locations in Newport Beach, California; San Francisco, California; Atlanta, Georgia; Reston, Virginia; Tukwila, Washington; Chicago; Los Angeles; and New York City.

The American Psychiatric Association has criticized the clinical appropriateness of Amen's use of brain scans, stating: "[T]he clinical utility of neuroimaging techniques for planning of individualized treatment has not yet been shown."

Operations
Amen Clinics was founded in 1989. It has been using brain SPECT in an attempt to diagnose and treat psychiatric illness since 1991. Amen Clinics incorporates questionnaires, clinical histories, and clinical interviews in its practice. Some Amen Clinics locations also use quantitative electroencephalography as a diagnostic tool. Amen Clinics has scanned 50,000 people at an estimated cost of $170 million according to Daniel Amen.

As of 2014, Amen Clinics had a database of more than 100,000 functional brain scans. The subjects are from 111 countries with ages from 9 months to 101 years old. The database was funded in part by Seeds Foundation in Hong Kong, and developed by Daniel Amen with a team of researchers including Kristen Willeumier.

Amen Clinics has worked to treat athletics-related brain damage for professional athletes, including current and 117 former National Football League players.

Effectiveness
Amen Clinics uses SPECT scans to measure blood flow and activity patterns in the brain. The company also uses diagnostics such as questionnaires, clinical histories, and clinical interviews.  Amen Clinics claims that SPECT scans enable doctors to tailor treatment to individual patients' brains. A retrospective study released by Amen in 2010 showed that "regional cerebral blood flow, as measured by SPECT, predicted stimulant response in 29 of 157 patients."

Harriet Hall has written critically about SPECT scans in articles for Quackwatch and for the Science-Based Medicine website. Hall accuses the clinics of misrepresenting an unproven treatment as effective, of concealing important warning information, and of creating false hopes by promising things that can't be done. She dismisses the scans as "pretty pictures" and says that although Amen himself seems to believe in his approach, "humans are very good at fooling themselves".

A 2011 paper co-authored by the neuroscientist Anjan Chatterjee discussed example cases that were found on the Amen Clinic's website. The paper noted that the example cases "violate the standard of care" because a normal clinical diagnosis would have been sufficient and functional neuroimaging was unnecessary. According to the American Psychiatric Association, "the clinical utility of neuroimaging techniques for planning of individualized treatment has not yet been shown."

References

External links

Neuroimaging
Mental health organizations in the United States
Pseudoscience